Alexei Ponikarovsky (born 9 April 1980) is a Ukrainian-Canadian former professional ice hockey left winger. He played in the National Hockey League (NHL) for the Toronto Maple Leafs, Pittsburgh Penguins, Los Angeles Kings, Carolina Hurricanes, Winnipeg Jets and New Jersey Devils, having originally been drafted in the third round, 87th overall, by the Maple Leafs at the 1998 NHL Entry Draft. He also holds Russian citizenship.

Playing career

As a youth, Ponikarovsky played in the 1994 Quebec International Pee-Wee Hockey Tournament with a team from Kyiv.
 
Ponikarovsky began his career with the Dynamo Moscow organization, playing with the team's affiliates, Dynamo-2 and Dynamo Jr., from 1995 to 1999 campaigns, seeing a little action with the main club during the 1998–99 season before becoming a regular fixture on the team during the 1999–2000 season when Dynamo won the Russian Superleague (RSL) championship.

In 1997–98, Ponikarovsky played 24 games for Dynamo in the First Division of the Russian Hockey League, collecting three points. He then played 13 games for Krylya Sovetov of the Russian Elite League in 1998–99 and played three playoff games for Dynamo.

In 1999–2000, Ponikarovsky played 19 games for Dynamo of the Russian Elite League and played 29 games for THK Tver in the First Division of the Russian Hockey League, collecting 22 points (eight goals and 14 assists).

In the 2005–06 season, Ponikarovsky put up career-highs in goals, assists, points and penalty minutes. He saw added responsibility and was given more ice-time, often with former Dynamo Moscow teammate Nik Antropov or Mats Sundin, and became one of the team's regular penalty-killers. Ponikarovsky finished the season with four shorthanded goals and one assist. His four shorthanded goals tied ten players, including teammate Matt Stajan, for eighth in the NHL.
 
On 16 December 2006, Ponikarovsky notched a career-high five points in Toronto's 9–2 victory over the New York Rangers, scoring two goals and assisting on three others. He was commonly referred to by his teammates as "The Poni Express", "The Ukraine Train" or simply "Poni". On 10 May 2007, the Maple Leafs re-signed Ponikarovsky to a three-year, $6.315 million contract extension.

On 2 March 2010, Ponikarovsky was traded to the Pittsburgh Penguins in exchange for Luca Caputi and Martin Škoula. Following the trade, he remained optimistic he would resume contract talks with Toronto in the off-season. In his debut game with the Penguins on 6 March 2010, against the Dallas Stars, he scored his first goal with his new team.

On 27 July 2010, Ponikarovsky signed with the Los Angeles Kings, receiving a signing bonus of $200,000 and a one-year contract for $3 million.

On 1 July 2011, Ponikarovsky signed a one-year contract with the Carolina Hurricanes reportedly worth $1.5 million.

On January 20, 2012, Ponikarovsky was traded to the New Jersey Devils in exchange for defenceman Joe Sova and a fourth-round pick in 2012. In 33 games, he scored 18 points before helping the Devils to the 2012 Stanley Cup Finals, scoring an overtime game winner in Game 3 of the Eastern Conference Semifinals against the Philadelphia Flyers.

On July 1, 2012, Ponikarovsky signed as a free agent with the Winnipeg Jets on a one-year, $1.8 million contract. However, due to the 2012–13 NHL lockout, Ponikarovsky signed a temporary contract with the Ukrainian Kontinental Hockey League (KHL) club HC Donbass for the 2012–13 season. In Donetsk, he had scored 18 points in 32 games, after which he returned to start the shortened NHL season with the Jets. After scoring only 2 goals in 12 games, Ponikarovsky was traded back to the New Jersey Devils in exchange for fourth- and seventh-round picks in the 2014 NHL Entry Draft on 13 February 2013.
 
Upon the conclusion of the 2012–13 season, with limited NHL interest in free agency, Ponikarovsky decided to return to the KHL, signing a two-year contract with SKA Saint Petersburg on 5 August 2013. The move reunited him with former New Jersey Devils teammate Ilya Kovalchuk, who also just signed with SKA.

Personal
On 7 June 2007, Ponikarovsky became a Canadian citizen during a ceremony in Etobicoke, Ontario. Ponikarovsky lives in Miami with his wife Inna, daughter Jessica, and sons Alex and Maxim, while still owning a house in Toronto. He has favoured wearing the number 23 as two of his grandparents were born on the 23rd, along with his wife. After signing with SKA Saint Petersburg, Ponikarovsky obtained additional Russian citizenship, as many Ukrainians in the KHL do.

Career statistics

Regular season and playoffs

International

References

External links
 
Russian Prospects profile

1980 births
Living people
Sportspeople from Kyiv
People with acquired Russian citizenship
HC Donbass players
HC Dynamo Moscow players
HC Khimik Voskresensk players
Krylya Sovetov Moscow players
HC Kunlun Red Star players
Ice hockey players at the 2002 Winter Olympics
Olympic ice hockey players of Ukraine
Ukrainian ice hockey left wingers
Ukrainian emigrants to Canada
Naturalized citizens of Canada
St. John's Maple Leafs players
Ukrainian expatriate sportspeople in the United States
Ukrainian expatriate sportspeople in Canada
Ukrainian expatriate sportspeople in Russia
Pittsburgh Penguins players
Los Angeles Kings players
Carolina Hurricanes players
New Jersey Devils players
SKA Saint Petersburg players
Toronto Maple Leafs draft picks
Toronto Maple Leafs players
Winnipeg Jets players
Expatriate ice hockey players in the United States
Expatriate ice hockey players in Canada
Expatriate ice hockey players in China
Ukrainian expatriate sportspeople in China
Ukrainian expatriate ice hockey people
Canadian expatriate ice hockey players in China